The 1916 Nebraska Cornhuskers football team represented the University of Nebraska in the 1916 college football season. The team was coached by first-year head coach E. J. Stewart and played its home games at Nebraska Field in Lincoln, Nebraska. They competed as members of the Missouri Valley Conference. Nebraska's loss to Kansas in November ended NU's 34-game unbeaten streak. Stewart, hired to replace the outgoing Ewald O. Stiehm,  also served as Nebraska's basketball coach and athletic director.

Schedule

Coaching staff

Roster

Game summaries

Drake

Sources:

Kansas State

Sources:

at Oregon Agricultural

Sources:

Nebraska traveled by train through Seattle and Spokane, making frequent publicity stops on the way to Portland to face head coach E. J. Stewart's former team. The university's annual yearbook predicted this would be the last time Nebraska's football team traveled so far from home. The Cornhuskers' 17–7 win gave the program its first West-Coast victory.

Nebraska Wesleyan

Sources:

Iowa State

Sources:

Kansas

Sources:

The Jayhawks held Nebraska to just a second-quarter field goal and used a series of big plays in the third to end Nebraska's 34-game unbeaten streak and 39-game home unbeaten streak. It was Nebraska's second loss in eight seasons at Nebraska Field, both to Kansas.

at Iowa

Sources:

Notre Dame

Sources:

Notre Dame's 20–0 defeat of Nebraska was the first time NU had been shutout in five seasons. The Irish were led by assistant Knute Rockne, as head coach Jesse Harper could not attend due to an annual coach's meeting in Chicago.

References

Nebraska
Nebraska Cornhuskers football seasons
Missouri Valley Conference football champion seasons
Nebraska Cornhuskers football